Karlha Francesca Magliocco is an amateur boxer. She was born in Ciudad Bolívar, Venezuela

She represented Venezuela in the 2012 Summer Olympics in the Flyweight division. She lost in the quarter finals to Marlen Esparza of USA 16-24.

Achievements

 2012 – Batalla de Carabobo Women's Tournament (Valencia, VEN) 1st place – 51 kg
 2011 – Panamerican Games (Guadalajara, MEX) 3rd place – 51 kg
 2010 – Panamerican Women’s Championships (Brasília, BRA) 1st place – 48 kg
 2011 – Batalla de Carabobo Tournament (Valencia, VEN) 1st place – 51 kg
 2011 – 1st Panamerican Games Qualification Tournament (Cumana, VEN) 2nd place – 51 kg
 2010 – Venezuelan Women’s National Championships 1st place – 48 kg

References

External links
 Facebook Profile
 Twitter Profile

1986 births
Living people
People from Ciudad Bolívar
Olympic boxers of Venezuela
Venezuelan women boxers
Boxers at the 2012 Summer Olympics
Pan American Games bronze medalists for Venezuela
Pan American Games medalists in boxing
Boxers at the 2011 Pan American Games
Flyweight boxers
Medalists at the 2011 Pan American Games